() is a commune in the northeastern suburbs of Paris, France.

Name

The name is interpreted by some as a reference to the houses of Le Blanc-Mesnil which were whitened due to the flour dust coming from the windmills located there in ancient times. One researcher, however, thinks that  had also the meaning of 'free' in Old French, and so the name would mean 'free mesnil, free village', perhaps because the villagers had been freed from serfdom. None of these interpretations is certain.

Geography

Nearest municipalities

Bondy
Aulnay-sous-Bois
Drancy
Le Bourget
Dugny
Bonneuil-en-France in Val d'Oise and Gonesse.

History

French Revolution

Heraldry

Economy
 
  in Blanc-Mesnil, Bourget and Drancy. It includes Centre Albert Einstein, created in 1987.
 
 Garonor
 
 
 
 , for tourism business. Three hotels three stars, a Novotel hotel.

French and international companies
Several French companies have their world headquarters in Blanc-Mesnil, such as Forclum and Sicli.

Population

Immigration

Administration

Political life
The following political parties have a permanent base in Blanc-Mesnil:

 Parti Communiste Français
 Parti Socialiste
 Union for French Democracy (UDF)
 Union for a Popular Movement (UMP)
 Groupe des Verts

Politics

Mayors

Transport
Le Blanc-Mesnil is served by Le Blanc-Mesnil station on Paris RER line B.

Le Blanc-Mesnil is also served by Drancy station on Paris RER line B. This station (formerly called ), although administratively located on the territory of the neighboring commune of Drancy, is the closest from the town center of Le Blanc-Mesnil and is thus used by people in Le Blanc-Mesnil.

The bus company provides 17 lines of buses to travel within the city.

Ideally placed at the junction between the A1 and the A3.

Religion
Evangelic churches:

Education
The commune has the following schools: four preschools in the south, seven preschools in the centre of town, and six preschools in the north. It has four elementary schools in the south, six elementary schools in the centre, and six elementary schools in the north.

Junior high schools:
 
 
 
 

Senior high schools:
 
 
 

The  Jacques Prévert serves as the municipal library.

Environment

Parks and gardens
 Jacques-Duclos Park
 Vineyards produces , a Chardonnay
 Vegetal wall of Forum culturel by Patrick Blanc
 
 
 Square Stalingrad

Sports
Blanc-Mesnil Sports (BMS), founded in 2005, is the city's sport club.

International relations
Le Blanc-Mesnil is twinned with: 
Sandwell in the West Midlands region of the United Kingdom,
Peterhof in Russia, 
Debre Berhan in Ethiopia,
Beni Douala in Algeria.

For fifteen years, twinning between le Blanc-Mesnil and Debre Berhan has been based on the development: water sanitation, education, construction of roads. In a rare spirit, that of a collaboration of equal to equal.

Personalities
 Jérémy Abadie, footballer
Adil Aouchiche, footballer
 Amara Baby, footballer
 Pierre-Edouard Bellemare, hockey player
 Jonathan Biabiany, footballer
 Jean-Felix Dorothee, footballer
 Abdou Doumbia, footballer
 Morgaro Gomis, footballer
 Raphaël Guerreiro, footballer
 Sylvie Guillem, star dancer at Paris Opera
 Patrick Hernandez, famous singer of Born to Be Alive
 Mickael Marolany, footballer
 Fabien Marsaud, known as Grand Corps Malade, slam poet
 Fabrice N'Sakala, footballer
 Moussa Sissoko, footballer
 Ludovic Sylvestre, footballer
 Tristan Valentin, road bicycle racer
 Élisabeth Vonarburg, writer of science-fiction

See also
Communes of the Seine-Saint-Denis department

References

Bibliography
 Le Blanc-Mesnil et son passé, Ernest Soitel, 1969.
 Histoire anecdotique de Blanc-Mesnil, Albert Galicier, 1973.
 Le Blanc-Mesnil des temps modernes : 1935-1985, 1986.
 Le Blanc-Mesnil, Pierre Bourgeade, Gilles Smadja, Jean-Pierre Vallorani, Françoise Vasseur, 1992.
 Le Blanc-Mesnil : citoyens de demain, Patrick Laigre et Jocelyne Héquet, 1993.
 Le Blanc-Mesnil : 2000 regards, Photographies de Luc Choquer, François Crignon, Erwan Guillard, 1999.
 Le Blanc-Mesnil, Christian Massart, 2005.
 Twinning between Le Blanc-Mesnil and Debré-Berhan (in English and French).

External links

 Official website
 Forum culturel
 Blog du Forum culturel

Communes of Seine-Saint-Denis